Heaven's Corner was a non-profit, USDA-licensed and certified zoo and animal sanctuary located in West Alexandria, Ohio.

The sanctuary was opened in 1990 to serve as a home for abandoned exotic animals.  In 1999, it opened to the public, in an attempt to help pay for the costs. The zoo was open to the public during the summer and fall, and appointments and educational tours were also available. In 2008, the zoo finished building a river otter exhibit, and had both a bear habitat and a large cat habitat under construction. In 2015, due to a law passed on exotic animals in Ohio, the zoo was forced to get rid of their felines and other large, carnivorous animals. The zoo officially announced that they were permanently closing on May 13, 2015.

Notes

Further reading
 Del Greco, Jill, Are Exotic Pets A Dangerous Problem In The Miami Valley?, WHIOTV.com, April 30, 2008
 Belcher, Shirley, Rescued Animals Find Home in W. Alexandria, Dayton Daily News, April 25, 2002
 Harrison, Tim, Wild Times: Tales from Suburban Safaris, Orange Frazer Press, 
 Harrison, Tim, Wildlife Warrior: More Tales from Suburban Safaris, Orange Frazer Press, 

Zoos in Ohio
Animal sanctuaries
1990 establishments in Ohio
2015 disestablishments in Ohio
Former zoos
Tourist attractions in Preble County, Ohio
Buildings and structures in Preble County, Ohio
Zoos established in 1990
Zoos disestablished in 2015